Forest View may refer to:

Education
Forest View High School, Tokoroa, New Zealand
Forest View High School, Arlington Heights, Illinois

Places in the United States
Forest View, Illinois
Forest View (Howard County, Maryland), on the National Register of Historic Places